The James F. Bridwell House in Kamiah, Idaho was listed on the National Register of Historic Places in 1989.  It has also been known as the Gena Dragseth House.

It is a square two-story house over a partial basement which was built in 1907. It has beaded shiplap siding.

The house was deemed significant for its association with "early settler and prominent citizen" Dr. James F. Bridwell.  Bridwell was educated in Oregon and trained as a dentist in St. Louis.  In a partnership with a Dr. Briley, he provided medical and dental services for the Northern Pacific Railroad construction.

See also
 List of National Historic Landmarks in Idaho
 National Register of Historic Places listings in Lewis County, Idaho

References

1907 establishments in Idaho
Colonial Revival architecture in Idaho
Houses completed in 1907
Houses in Lewis County, Idaho
Houses on the National Register of Historic Places in Idaho
National Register of Historic Places in Lewis County, Idaho